Saskatoon Meewasin provincial by-election may refer to:

 2017 Saskatoon Meewasin provincial by-election
 2022 Saskatoon Meewasin provincial by-election